Hunsdon is a village and civil parish in Hertfordshire, England. The population of the village taken at the 2011 Census was 1,080.

See also
Baron Hunsdon
Hunsdon Airfield
The Hundred Parishes

References

External links
Hunsdon Village Hall
Hunsdon JMI School
Hunsdon Village Web
The Fox and Hounds

Villages in Hertfordshire
Civil parishes in Hertfordshire
East Hertfordshire District